Spurius Postumius Albus Regillensis, apparently the son of the Spurius Postumius Albus Regillensis who was consul in 466 BC, was a patrician politician of ancient Rome.  He was appointed consular tribune in 432 BC, and served as legatus in the war in the following year, under the dictator Aulus Postumius Tubertus.  Livy mentions him leading a group of reinforcements at a critical moment.

See also
 Postumia gens
 Albinus (cognomen)

References

5th-century BC Romans
Roman legates
Roman consular tribunes
Postumii Albini
Roman patricians